Roland Montgomery Armitage (born February 8, 1925) is a veterinarian, businessman and former politician in Ontario. Armitage served as mayor of West Carleton Township, Ontario from 1991 to 1994. He also served on the council for the Regional Municipality of Ottawa-Carleton.

During World War II, he served with the Royal Canadian Artillery and took part in the Normandy invasion and the liberation of France. After the war, Armitage attended the Ontario Veterinary College, graduating in 1951. He also bred and raced horses, and was track veterinarian at Connaught Park. Armitage served as the president of the Canadian Standardbred Horse Society from 1972 to 1974 and the Canadian Trotting Association from 1974 to 1980. He was general manager of Rideau Carleton Raceway for nine years. In 1987, he ran unsuccessfully as a Liberal in the Ontario riding of Carleton, losing to Norm Sterling. In 1999, he was named to the Canadian Horse Racing Hall of Fame.

In 2011, the hall at the West Carleton community complex was renamed the Dr. Roland Armitage Hall.

References 

1925 births
Living people
Military personnel from Ottawa
Animal sportspeople from Ontario
Canadian Horse Racing Hall of Fame inductees
Canadian Army personnel of World War II
Mayors of West Carleton Township
Canadian sportsperson-politicians
Royal Regiment of Canadian Artillery personnel